John McKathmoyll was a priest in Ireland in the 15th century: a Canon of Armagh he was Dean of Clogher in 1458.

References

15th-century Irish Roman Catholic priests
Deans of Clogher